Acanthiophilus helianthi is a species of fruit fly in the family Tephritidae.

Description
Europe, to Mongolia, North Africa, Afghanistan & Thailand.

References

Tephritinae
Diptera of Europe
Diptera of Asia
Diptera of Africa
Insects described in 1794